Neocollyris apteroides is a species of ground beetle in the genus Neocollyris in the family Carabidae. It was described by Horn in 1901.

References

Apteroides, Neocollyris
Beetles described in 1901
Taxa named by Walther Horn